Hassea is a genus of fungi in the class Dothideomycetes. The relationship of this taxon to other taxa within the class is unknown (incertae sedis). A monotypic genus, it contains the single species Hassea bacillosa.

The genus name of Hassea is in honour of Hermann Edward Hasse (1836–1915), who was an American lichenologist.

The genus was circumscribed by Alexander Zahlbruckner in Beih. Bot. Centralbl. vol.13 (issue 2) on page 150 in 1902.

See also
 List of Dothideomycetes genera incertae sedis

References

Dothideomycetes enigmatic taxa
Monotypic Dothideomycetes genera
Taxa named by Alexander Zahlbruckner
Taxa described in 1902